Larry Ritchie was a jazz drummer and record/CD producer. He was born in Brooklyn, New York as Lawrence Ritchie to Walter Ritchie, an electrician, and Pearl Ritchie, a domestic worker, both of whom were migrants from rural Virginia.

He has recorded with John Coltrane, Ray Draper, and Jackie McLean. Examples of his jazz work are provided by McLean's Strange Blues (1957) and Freddie Redd's Music from The Connection (1960).

Ritchie was also a talented painter and by the mid-1960s, he devoted more of his time to painting than to music.

Discography
With John Coltrane
Like Sonny (Capitol, 1958–60)
With Ray Draper
The Ray Draper Quintet featuring John Coltrane (Prestige, 1957)
A Tuba Jazz (Jubilee, 1958)
With Jackie McLean
Fat Jazz (Jubilee, 1957)
Strange Blues (Prestige, 1957)
With Freddie Redd
The Connection (Blue Note, 1960)

References

External links
https://www.discogs.com/artist/746337-Larry-Ritchie

Jazz drummers
Year of birth missing (living people)
Possibly living people